Texas 2036 is a nonpartisan public policy think tank founded by Dallas attorney Tom Luce. Former U.S. Secretary of Education Margaret Spellings joined the organization in 2019 and is president and CEO. The organization has offices in Dallas and Austin, Texas.

The organization's name is based on the year of Texas's bicentennial. Texas 2036 focuses education and workforce; health; infrastructure; natural resources; justice and safety; and government performance.

Activities

K12 education
In 2021, Texas 2036 and the Center for Houston's Future, an independent affiliate of the Greater Houston Partnership, released a report analyzing the impact of world oil prices on Texas public education funding. The report found that "reliance on the oil and gas industry could jeopardize up to $29 billion in public school funding over the next 15 years."

Health care
Texas 2036 developed an online tool for evaluating health care policy.

COVID-19
Texas 2036 launched a website that tracked COVID-19 data.

Weather
In 2020, Texas 2036 funded a study on Texas weather patterns conducted by the Office of the Texas State Climatologist at Texas A&M University. An updated version of the study was released in October 2021.

References

External links
 
 Texas COVID-19 Data Resource
 Texas Health Coverage Policy Explorer

Organizations based in Austin, Texas
Organizations based in Dallas
Think tanks
Political and economic think tanks in the United States
Nonpartisan organizations in the United States
Organizations established in 2018